René Sylvain Kahn (born 1954) is a neuropsychiatrist and the Esther and Joseph Klingenstein Professor and System Chair of Psychiatry at the Icahn School of Medicine at Mount Sinai in the United States, a position he has held since 2017. He previously served as Professor of Psychiatry and Director of the Brain Center Rudolf Magnus at the University Medical Center Utrecht in the Netherlands. Kahn is recognized for his research on the neurobiology of schizophrenia. He served as a former president of the Schizophrenia International Research Society and was elected to the Royal Netherlands Academy of Arts and Sciences in 2009. He received the Neuropsychopharmacology Award from the European College of Neuropsychopharmacology in 2014.

, he was principal or co-principal investigator of more than 40 grants, written 39 books and book chapters and published more than 950 peer-reviewed articles.

Biography 
Kahn studied medicine from 1972 to 1979 at the University of Groningen, and then specialized in psychiatry and neurology at the University of Utrecht and the Academic Medical Center, respectively. He is a registered neuropsychiatrist since 1986. In 1990 he obtained his Ph.D. with professors Herman van Praag and David de Wied as mentors at the University of Utrecht on the thesis Serotonin Receptor Hypersensitivity in Panic Disorder: an Hypothesis.

Kahn served in the Royal Netherlands Army as a first lieutenant in 1980 and 1981.

Following residencies in the Netherlands, he attended the Albert Einstein College of Medicine in New York City for a research fellowship in biological psychiatry. From there he completed psychiatry residencies at Mount Sinai Hospital and then acted as the chief of the psychiatry research unit at the Bronx VA Hospital. In 1993 he returned to the Netherlands be the chair of psychiatry at the University Medical Center. He led the Brain Center Rudolf Magnus—a multi-discipline center for research in fundamental neuroscience, psychiatry, neurology, neurosurgery and rehabilitation medicine—for over 10 years.

Honors and awards 

 Fulbright Scholarship (1985)
 ECNP Neuropsychopharmacology Award (2014)
 Honorary doctorate at Semmelweis University in Budapest, Hungary (2014)
 Lifetime achievement award of the Netherlands Psychiatric Association (2016)
 Ramaer Medaille (1989)
 Honorary Lifetime Professor at Jilin University in Changchun, China (2010)
 Treasurer and Vice-President of the European College of Neuropsychopharmacology (2002–2007)
 President of The Schizophrenia International Research Society (2014–2016)
 Fellow, American College of Neuropsychopharmacology
 Chairman of the Dutch Association for Psychiatry (2003–2006)
 Member of the Royal Netherlands Academy of Arts and Sciences (2009)

Research 
Kahn studies biological causes of psychiatric disorders such as schizophrenia and has led numerous consortia examining the brain changes that play a role in schizophrenia. He has coordinated several international trials to optimize the treatment of schizophrenia.

He is known for helping establish proof that schizophrenia debuts with cognitive dysfunction, preceding the onset of the first incidence of psychosis by more than a decade. He and associates further showed that brain volume is one of the most heritable characteristics, paving the way to link brain volumes in health and disease to genetic variation.

Grants and trials 
As of 2020, Kahn is the principal investigator or co-principal investigator on 13 active grants related to child development and drug augmentation for onset schizophrenia to prevent psychosis and cognitive therapy symptoms.

Active grant in 2020:

Publications

Editorial 
As of 2020, Kahn is on the editorial board of Schizophrenia Research, European Neuropsychopharmacology, Schizophrenia Bulletin and Early Intervention in Psychosis.

Peer reviewed articles 
Kahn authored or co-authored over 990 scientific papers with an H index, Thomson Reuters: 108; cites: > 53,000 and an H index, Google Scholar: 176; cites: > 175,000.

Partial list:

 Sher L, Kahn RS. Suicide in Schizophrenia: An Educational Overview. Medicina (Kaunas). 2019 Jul 10;55(7):361. doi: 10.3390/medicina55070361. ; PMCID: PMC6681260.
 Böttcher C, Schlickeiser S, Sneeboer MAM, Kunkel D, Knop A, Paza E, Fidzinski P, Kraus L, Snijders GJL, Kahn RS, Schulz AR, Mei HE; NBB-Psy, Hol EM, Siegmund B, Glauben R, Spruth EJ, de Witte LD, Priller J. Human microglia regional heterogeneity and phenotypes determined by multiplexed single-cell mass cytometry. Nat Neurosci. 2019 Jan;22(1):78-90. doi: 10.1038/s41593-018-0290-2. Epub 2018 Dec 17. .
 Turk E, van den Heuvel MI, Benders MJ, de Heus R, Franx A, Manning JH, Hect JL, Hernandez-Andrade E, Hassan SS, Romero R, Kahn RS, Thomason ME, van den Heuvel MP. Functional Connectome of the Fetal Brain. J Neurosci. 2019 Dec 4;39(49):9716-9724. doi: 10.1523/JNEUROSCI.2891-18.2019. Epub 2019 Nov 4. ; PMCID: PMC6891066.
 Hess JL, Tylee DS, Mattheisen M; Schizophrenia Working Group of the Psychiatric Genomics Consortium; Lundbeck Foundation Initiative for Integrative Psychiatric Research (iPSYCH), Børglum AD, Als TD, Grove J, Werge T, Mortensen PB, Mors O, Nordentoft M, Hougaard DM, Byberg-Grauholm J, Bækvad-Hansen M, Greenwood TA, Tsuang MT, Curtis D, Steinberg S, Sigurdsson E, Stefánsson H, Stefánsson K, Edenberg HJ, Holmans P, Faraone SV, Glatt SJ. A polygenic resilience score moderates the genetic risk for schizophrenia. Mol Psychiatry. 2019 Sep 6:10.1038/s41380-019-0463-8. doi: 10.1038/s41380-019-0463-8. Epub ahead of print. ; PMCID: PMC7058518.
 Kahn RS. On the Origins of Schizophrenia. Am J Psychiatry. 2020 Apr 1;177(4):291-297. doi: 10.1176/appi.ajp.2020.20020147. .
 Ormel PR, Vieira de Sá R, van Bodegraven EJ, Karst H, Harschnitz O, Sneeboer MAM, Johansen LE, van Dijk RE, Scheefhals N, Berdenis van Berlekom A, Ribes Martínez E, Kling S, MacGillavry HD, van den Berg LH, Kahn RS, Hol EM, de Witte LD, Pasterkamp RJ. Microglia innately develop within cerebral organoids. Nat Commun. 2018 Oct 9;9(1):4167. doi: 10.1038/s41467-018-06684-2. ; PMCID: PMC6177485.
 Bipolar Disorder and Schizophrenia Working Group of the Psychiatric Genomics Consortium. Electronic address: douglas.ruderfer@vanderbilt.edu; Bipolar Disorder and Schizophrenia Working Group of the Psychiatric Genomics Consortium. Genomic Dissection of Bipolar Disorder and Schizophrenia, Including 28 Subphenotypes. Cell. 2018 Jun 14;173(7):1705-1715.e16. doi: 10.1016/j.cell.2018.05.046. ; PMCID: PMC6432650.
 Böttcher C, Schlickeiser S, Sneeboer MAM, Kunkel D, Knop A, Paza E, Fidzinski P, Kraus L, Snijders GJL, Kahn RS, Schulz AR, Mei HE; NBB-Psy, Hol EM, Siegmund B, Glauben R, Spruth EJ, de Witte LD, Priller J. Human microglia regional heterogeneity and phenotypes determined by multiplexed single-cell mass cytometry. Nat Neurosci. 2019 Jan;22(1):78-90. doi: 10.1038/s41593-018-0290-2. Epub 2018 Dec 17. .
 Böttcher C, Schlickeiser S, Sneeboer MAM, Kunkel D, Knop A, Paza E, Fidzinski P, Kraus L, Snijders GJL, Kahn RS, Schulz AR, Mei HE; NBB-Psy, Hol EM, Siegmund B, Glauben R, Spruth EJ, de Witte LD, Priller J. Human microglia regional heterogeneity and phenotypes determined by multiplexed single-cell mass cytometry. Nat Neurosci. 2019 Jan;22(1):78-90. doi: 10.1038/s41593-018-0290-2. Epub 2018 Dec 17. .
 Schür RR, van Leeuwen JMC, Houtepen LC, Joëls M, Kahn RS, Boks MP, Vinkers CH. Glucocorticoid receptor exon 1Fmethylation and the cortisol stress response in health and disease. Psychoneuroendocrinology. 2018 Nov;97:182-189. doi: 10.1016/j.psyneuen.2018.07.018. Epub 2018 Jul 11. .

Books and chapters 
Partial list:

 Kahn RS. De appel en de Boom. Uitgeverij Balans, Amsterdam 2011.  (3 editions)
 Kahn RS. In de spreekkamer van de psychiater. Uitgeverij Balans, Amsterdam 2008. , NUR 875 (6 printings)
 Kahn RS. Onze Hersenen., Over de smalle grens tussen normaal en abnormaal. Uitgeverij Balans, Amsterdam 2006, 2007, 2008. , NUR 875 (12 printings)
 De Haan L, Kahn RS. Psychotische stoornissen. In: Leerboek Psychiatrie (Hengeveld, van Balkom eds). De Tijdstroom uitgeverij, 2005.  / 5898 094 4, NUR 875

References

External links
Faculty page

Dutch psychiatrists
Icahn School of Medicine at Mount Sinai faculty
Living people
1954 births
Dutch emigrants to the United States
Schizophrenia researchers
Members of the Royal Netherlands Academy of Arts and Sciences
Academic staff of Utrecht University